Mickel Pierre (born March 13, 1988, in Arouca, Trinidad and Tobago), is a  field hockey player who plays in the midfielder position.

He has represented Trinidad and Tobago internationally at the Commonwealth Games, Pan American Games and Pan American Cup.

Pierre has played club hockey for Canterbury.

References

1988 births
Trinidad and Tobago male field hockey players
Male field hockey midfielders
Field hockey players at the 2010 Commonwealth Games
Field hockey players at the 2014 Commonwealth Games
Field hockey players at the 2011 Pan American Games
Living people
Field hockey players at the 2015 Pan American Games
Field hockey players at the 2019 Pan American Games
Central American and Caribbean Games silver medalists for Trinidad and Tobago
Central American and Caribbean Games bronze medalists for Trinidad and Tobago
Commonwealth Games competitors for Trinidad and Tobago
Pan American Games competitors for Trinidad and Tobago

2018 FIH Indoor Hockey World Cup players